Grant Connell and Patrick Galbraith defeated Jacco Eltingh and Paul Haarhuis in the final, 7–6(8–6), 7–6(8–6), 3–6, 7–6(7–2) to win the doubles tennis title at the 1995 ATP Tour World Championships.

Jan Apell and Jonas Björkman were the reigning champions, but failed to qualify that year.

Seeds

Draw

Finals

Group A
Standings are determined by: 1. number of wins; 2. number of matches; 3. in two-players-ties, head-to-head records; 4. in three-players-ties, percentage of sets won, or of games won; 5. steering-committee decision.

Group B
Standings are determined by: 1. number of wins; 2. number of matches; 3. in two-players-ties, head-to-head records; 4. in three-players-ties, percentage of sets won, or of games won; 5. steering-committee decision.

External links
Finals Draw
Round robin Draw (Group A)
Round robin Draw (Group B)

Doubles